Mafenide (INN; usually as mafenide acetate, trade name Sulfamylon) is a sulfonamide-type medication used as an antibiotic. It was approved by the FDA in 1948.

Uses
Mafenide is used to treat severe burns.  It is used topically as an adjunctive therapy for second- and third-degree burns. It is bacteriostatic against many gram-positive and gram-negative organisms, including Pseudomonas aeruginosa. Some sources state that mafenide is more appropriate for non-facial burns, while chloramphenicol/prednisolone or bacitracin are more appropriate for facial burns.

Mechanism of action 
Mafenide works by reducing the bacterial population present in the avascular tissues of burns and permits spontaneous healing of deep partial-thickness burns.

Adverse reactions 
Adverse reactions can include superinfection, pain or burning upon application, rash, pruritus, tachypnea, or hyperventilation. Mafenide is metabolized to a carbonic anhydrase inhibitor, which could potentially result in metabolic acidosis.

Drug interactions 
There are no significant interactions.

Contraindications 
Mafenide is contraindicated in those with sulfonamide hypersensitivity or renal impairment.

Dosage 
For use as adjunctive therapy for second- and third-degree burns to prevent infection, adults and children should apply topically to a thickness of approximately 1.6 mm to cleaned and debrided wound once or twice per day with a sterile gloved hand. The burned area should be covered with cream at all times.

References

External links
 Mafenide information on RxList

Carbonic anhydrase inhibitors
Sulfonamide antibiotics